The 1996 Japanese Grand Prix (officially known as the XXII Fuji Television Japanese Grand Prix)  was a Formula One motor race held at Suzuka on 13 October 1996. It was the sixteenth and final race of the 1996 Formula One World Championship.

The 52-lap race was won by Damon Hill, driving a Williams-Renault. Hill took his eighth win of the season, and with it the Drivers' Championship, after teammate and pole-sitter Jacques Villeneuve made a poor start and then retired when a wheel fell off. Villeneuve had needed to win the race, without Hill scoring, in order to win the Championship himself. Michael Schumacher finished second in a Ferrari, enabling the Italian team to steal second place in the Constructors' Championship from Benetton, with Mika Häkkinen third in a McLaren-Mercedes.

This was also the final race for Martin Brundle, who had been competing in F1 since  and finished on the podium 9 times since , as well as the last race for Pedro Lamy, Giovanni Lavaggi and Ligier.

Report

Background and qualifying 
This was the first time since 1977 that Japan hosted the final round of the World Championship. In qualifying, Villeneuve beat Hill to pole position by nearly half a second, with a further 0.7 seconds back to Schumacher in third.

Race 
On race day, the first start was aborted when David Coulthard stalled his McLaren.  At the second start, Villeneuve made a poor getaway and fell to sixth behind Hill, Gerhard Berger, Häkkinen, Schumacher and Eddie Irvine. Meanwhile, Jean Alesi, attempting to make up several places after qualifying ninth, spun off at the second corner and destroyed his Benetton, Alesi was unhurt from the impact. On the third lap, Berger attempted to overtake Hill at the final chicane, only to damage his front wing. 

Thereafter, Hill gradually pulled away, with Schumacher overtaking Häkkinen for second during the first round of pit stops. Pedro Diniz had lost control of his Ligier at the final chicane and spun off into the gravel trap by lap 14. Hill pitted for his second stop with a 25-second gap to Schumacher, emerging narrowly ahead of the Ferrari, before pulling away gradually once again to lead by 13 seconds with ten laps remaining. 

Villeneuve, meanwhile, passed Irvine, set the fastest lap of the race and ran fourth before his right rear wheel came off on lap 37 due to a wheel bearing failure (This was the same incident that happened to teammate Damon Hill during the British Grand Prix, according to BBC pit reporter Tony Jardine), putting him out of the race and handing the Drivers' Championship to Hill, already dropped by Williams for the following season. Whilst fighting for 4th place, Gerhard Berger had another collision with the Ferrari of Eddie Irvine at the final chicane causing the Northern Irishman to spin out and retire, but Berger was able to carry on unscathed. A late fightback saw Schumacher close the gap to Hill, but Hill held on to win the race by 1.8 seconds, with Häkkinen a further 1.4 seconds back, while Berger recovered to finish fourth, Martin Brundle came fifth in his final Grand Prix, and Heinz-Harald Frentzen picked up the final point for sixth.

In the UK, this was the last F1 race until  to be broadcast live by the BBC. As Hill crossed the line to win the race and the championship, commentator Murray Walker said, "And I've got to stop, because I've got a lump in my throat."

Classification

Qualifying

Race

Championship standings after the race

Drivers' Championship standings

Constructors' Championship standings

References

Japanese Grand Prix
Japanese Grand Prix
Grand Prix
Japanese Grand Prix